The 40th Curtis Cup Match was played from June 8–10, 2018 at Quaker Ridge Golf Club, Scarsdale, New York. The United States dominated the match, winning by 17 matches to 3 including all 8 of the singles matches.

Format
The contest was a three-day competition, with three foursomes and three fourball matches on each of the first two days, and eight singles matches on the final day, a total of 20 points.

Each of the 20 matches is worth one point in the larger team competition. If a match is all square after the 18th hole, extra holes are not played. Rather, each side earns  a point toward their team total. The team that accumulates at least 10 points wins the competition. In the event of a tie, the current holder retains the Cup.

Teams
Eight players for the USA and Great Britain & Ireland participated in the event plus one non-playing captain for each team.

The American team was selected by the USGA’s International Team Selection Committee.

Two members of the Great Britain & Ireland team were selected automatically, the top two in the World Amateur Golf Ranking (WAGR) as of April 25, 2018. The remaining six were picked by the R&A Women's Selection Committee. Leona Maguire, second in the world rankings, ruled herself out, as she intended to turn professional before the event.

Note: "Rank" is the World Amateur Golf Ranking as of the start of the Cup.

Friday's matches

Morning fourballs

Afternoon foursomes

Saturday's matches

Morning fourballs

Afternoon foursomes

Sunday's singles matches

References

External links
Official site
USGA site

Curtis Cup
Golf in New York (state)
Curtis Cup
Curtis Cup
Curtis Cup
Curtis Cup